Andre Leander Arendse (born 27 June 1967) is a South African former soccer player who played as a goalkeeper.

He now works as an assistant and goalkeeper coach for Supersport United and has also been a co-presenter with SuperSport.

Playing career

Club career
Arendse made his debut in 1991 for Cape Town Spurs in the now defunct NSL, being loaned to Cape Town side Santos in 1992. He later played professionally for Oxford United, Fulham (both England), Santos, Mamelodi Sundowns and SuperSport United.

He retired from football in 2009 winning the Premier Soccer League title with SuperSport United. In May 2013, Arendse returned as an emergency goalkeeper for Bidvest Wits due to injuries to the club's goalkeepers Steven Hoffman, Jackson Mabokgwane, Emile Baron and Ryan Harrison. This made him the oldest player in PSL history surpassing the previous record set by Bruce Grobbelaar.

International career
He represented South Africa 67 times having made his debut in 1995. He was initially in the 1998 FIFA World Cup squad, but had to pull out due to injury. His replacement Paul Evans also withdrew through injury and was replaced by Simon Gopane. He was later a participant at the 2002 FIFA World Cup, and retired from his international career in 2004. He was part of the squad that won the 1996 African Cup of Nations.

References

External links

BBC Sport article about the 2002 World Cup

1967 births
Living people
Soccer players from Cape Town
South African soccer players
Cape Coloureds
South Africa international soccer players
South African expatriate soccer players
Fulham F.C. players
Oxford United F.C. players
Mamelodi Sundowns F.C. players
SuperSport United F.C. players
English Football League players
Association football goalkeepers
1996 African Cup of Nations players
1997 FIFA Confederations Cup players
2000 African Cup of Nations players
2002 FIFA World Cup players
2002 African Cup of Nations players
2004 African Cup of Nations players
Expatriate footballers in England
Bidvest Wits F.C. players
Africa Cup of Nations-winning players
Cape Town Spurs F.C. players